Bathville is a village in West Lothian, Scotland.

Bathville now forms a section of Armadale in West Lothian, it is located (1 km) south of the town centre and 2 miles north of Whitburn. In the middle of the 19th century Bathville comprised only a farm-steading, a coal pit and a row of houses. Today, in addition to housing, there is a business park here.

External links

Museum of the Scottish shale oil industry - Bathville Paraffin Works

Villages in West Lothian
Armadale, West Lothian